The Godz may refer to:

The Godz (New York band), formed in 1966
The Godz (Ohio band)
The Godz (album), an album by The Godz from Ohio
"The Godz...", a song by Brand Nubian from their 1993 album In God We Trust

See also
God (disambiguation)
Gods (disambiguation)